James Paul DePaiva (born October 8, 1957) is an American soap opera actor.

Career
DePaiva is known for portraying Max Holden on the ABC Daytime soap opera One Life to Live from 1987 to 1990 and from 1991 to 2003. He made a brief return to the series in August 2007 for the 9,999th and 10,000th episodes.

After leaving the role of Max on OLTL he took up directing, helming installments of OLTL and As the World Turns.

From June 2017 to 2018, DePaiva played the recurring role of Dr. David Bensch on the ABC soap opera General Hospital.

Personal life
DePaiva is the oldest of four children born to Ronald J. DePaiva and his wife Rosemarie.

DePaiva's second marriage was to former Hee Haw actress Misty Rowe on June 4, 1986; they divorced in 1995. They had one daughter, Dreama Marie (born July 2, 1992).

While on One Life to Live, DePaiva married his co-star Kassie Wesley on May 31, 1996. They have one son, James Quentin (J. Q.), born May 12, 1997. J. Q. is hearing impaired and had implants prior to age one. In late 2007, J. Q. appeared on All My Children on Erica Kane's television show at her request in hopes this would help her daughter Kendall deal with the hearing loss of her own son Spike.

Prior to starting his professional acting career, DePaiva spent several years as a musician. One of the bands he played with was Livewire, based out of Livermore, CA. DePaiva played bass.

References

External links
 

1957 births
Living people
American male soap opera actors
American people of Portuguese descent
People from Livermore, California